Classic Tracks  is a progressive rock album of re-makes of classic Rick Wakeman songs. It features Wakeman and four American musicians.

Despite the good reviews by fans, Wakeman claims this album was finished and released without his authorization. He also claims that he was threatened with violence if he interfered with the release and was told he wouldn't receive any compensation for it.

In this album, lyrics were added to the 1975 instrumental song "Merlin the Magician" from The Myths and Legends of King Arthur and the Knights of the Round Table. Despite Rick's feelings about this album, this new version of "Merlin the Magician" was later played on tour and one of those performances can be seen on the "Live in Buenos Aires" DVD.

Although Journey to the Centre of the Earth was a song from 1974, this was the first time it was recorded in the studio. This version however is very different from the original. It is a more up-to-date, heavier version and it has no narration. The number of instruments was also very small compared to the original version.

Track listing

"Journey to the Centre of the Earth"
"Catherine Howard"
"Merlin The Magician" (with vocals)

Personnel

 Rick Wakeman - keyboards
 Michael T. Franklin - lead vocals, keyboards
 Jim Gentry - guitars
 Paul Parker - drums, percussion
 Tim Franklin - bass, backing vocals
 Tom Hook, Tess Franklin, The Full Sail Tabernacle Choir - additional vocals

Production

 Michael Franklin - producer
 Don Oriolo - producer (exec.)
 Stuart Sawney - recording engineer (Banjour Studio)
 Gary Platt - engineer (Full Sail Platinum Post studio)
 Ken Latchney, Nasser Sharif - assistants (Full Sail Platinum Post studio)
 O. B. O'Brian, Phil Nicolo - engineers (Studio 4)
 Jiff Hinger, Dirk Grobelny - assistants (Studio 4)
 Jay Goodman - main tech
 Tibor Kovalik - Artwork

References

Rick Wakeman albums
1993 albums